Requiem sharks are sharks of the family Carcharhinidae in the order Carcharhiniformes. They are migratory, live-bearing sharks of warm seas (sometimes of brackish or fresh water) and include such species as the tiger shark, bull shark, lemon shark, spinner shark, blacknose shark, blacktip shark, grey reef shark, blacktip reef shark, silky shark, dusky shark, blue shark, copper shark, oceanic whitetip shark, and whitetip reef shark.

Family members have the usual carcharhiniform characteristics. Their eyes are round, and one or two gill slits fall over the pectoral fin base. Most species are viviparous, the young being born fully developed. They vary widely in size, from as small as  adult length in the Australian sharpnose shark, up to  adult length in the tiger shark. Scientists assume that the size and shape of their pectoral fins have the right dimensions to minimize transport cost. Requiem sharks tend to live in more tropical areas, but tend to migrate. Females release a chemical in the ocean in order to let the males know they are ready to mate. Typical mating time for these sharks is around spring to autumn.

Requiem sharks are among the top five species involved in shark attacks on humans; however, due to the difficulty in identifying individual species, a degree of inaccuracy exists in attack records.

Etymology
The common name requiem shark may be related to the French word for shark, requin, which is itself of disputed etymology. One derivation of the latter is from Latin requiem ("rest"), which would thereby create a cyclic etymology (requiem-requin-requiem), but other sources derive it from the Old French verb reschignier ("to grimace while baring teeth").

The scientific name Carcharhinidae was first proposed in 1896 by D.S. Jordan and B.W. Evermann as a subfamily of Galeidae (now replaced by "Carcharhinidae"). The term is derived from Greek karcharos (sharp or jagged); and rhine (rasp), both elements describe the jagged, rasp-like skin. Rasp-like skin is typical of shark skin in general, and is not diagnostic to Carcharhinidae.

Evolutionary history 
The oldest member of the family is Archaeogaleus lengadocensis from the Early Cretaceous (Valanginian) of France. Only a handful of records of the group are known from prior to the beginning of the Cenozoic. Modern carcharinid sharks have extensively diversified in coral reef habitats.

Hunting strategies

Requiem sharks are extraordinarily fast and effective hunters. Their elongated, torpedo-shaped bodies make them quick and agile swimmers, so they can easily attack any prey. They have a range of food sources depending on their location and species that includes bony fish, squids, octopuses, lobsters, turtles, marine mammals, seabird, other sharks and rays. They are often considered the "garbage cans" of the seas because they will eat almost anything, even non-food items like trash. They are migratory hunters that follow their food source across entire oceans. They tend to be most active at night time, where their impressive eyesight can help them sneak up on unsuspecting prey. Most requiem sharks hunt alone, however some species like the whitetip reef sharks and lemon sharks are cooperative feeders and will hunt in packs through coordinated, timed attacks against their prey.

Classification
The 60 species of requiem shark are grouped into 12 genera:
 Genus Galeocerdo J. P. Müller & Henle, 1837
 Galeocerdo cuvier Péron & Lesueur, 1822 (tiger shark)
 Genus Scoliodon J. P. Müller & Henle, 1838
 Scoliodon laticaudus J. P. Müller & Henle, 1838 (spadenose shark)
 Scoliodon macrorhynchos Bleeker, 1852 (Pacific spadenose shark)
 Genus Carcharhinus Blainville, 1816
Carcharhinus acronotus Poey, 1860 (blacknose shark)
 Carcharhinus albimarginatus Rüppell, 1837 (silvertip shark)
 Carcharhinus altimus S. Springer, 1950 (bignose shark)
 Carcharhinus amblyrhynchoides Whitley, 1934 (graceful shark)
 Carcharhinus amblyrhynchos Bleeker, 1856 (grey reef shark)
 Carcharhinus amboinensis J. P. Müller & Henle, 1839 (pigeye shark)
 Carcharhinus borneensis Bleeker, 1858 (Borneo shark)
 Carcharhinus brachyurus Günther, 1870 (copper shark)
 Carcharhinus brevipinna J. P. Müller & Henle, 1839 (spinner shark)
 Carcharhinus cautus Whitley, 1945 (nervous shark)
 Carcharhinus cerdale C. H. Gilbert, 1898 (Pacific smalltail shark)
 Carcharhinus coatesi Whitley, 1939 (Coates's shark)
 Carcharhinus dussumieri J. P. Müller & Henle, 1839 (whitecheek shark)
 Carcharhinus falciformis J. P. Müller & Henle, 1839 (silky shark)
 Carcharhinus fitzroyensis Whitley, 1943 (creek whaler)
 Carcharhinus galapagensis Snodgrass & Heller, 1905 (Galapagos shark)
 Carcharhinus hemiodon J. P. Müller & Henle, 1839 (Pondicherry shark)
 Carcharhinus humani W. T. White & Weigmann, 2014 (Human's whaler shark)
 Carcharhinus isodon J. P. Müller & Henle, 1839 (finetooth shark)
 Carcharhinus leiodon Garrick, 1985 (smoothtooth blacktip shark)
 Carcharhinus leucas J. P. Müller & Henle, 1839 (bull shark)
 Carcharhinus limbatus J. P. Müller & Henle, 1839 (blacktip shark)
 Carcharhinus longimanus Poey, 1861 (oceanic whitetip shark)
 Carcharhinus macloti J. P. Müller & Henle, 1839 (hardnose shark)
 Carcharhinus melanopterus Quoy & Gaimard, 1824 (blacktip reef shark)
 Carcharhinus obscurus Lesueur, 1818 (dusky shark)
 Carcharhinus perezi Poey, 1876 (Caribbean reef shark)
 Carcharhinus plumbeus Nardo, 1827 (sandbar shark)
 Carcharhinus porosus Ranzani, 1839 (smalltail shark)
 Carcharhinus sealei Pietschmann, 1913 (blackspot shark)
 Carcharhinus signatus Poey, 1868 (night shark)
 Carcharhinus sorrah J. P. Müller & Henle, 1839 (spot-tail shark)
 Carcharhinus tilstoni Whitley, 1950 (Australian blacktip shark)
 †Carcharhinus tingae
 Carcharhinus tjutjot Bleeker, 1852 (Indonesian whaler shark)
 Carcharhinus obsolerus White, Kyne, and Harris, 2019  (lost shark)
 Genus Glyphis Agassiz, 1843
 Glyphis gangeticus (J. P. Müller & Henle, 1839) (Ganges shark)
 Glyphis garricki Compagno, W. T. White & Last, 2008 (northern river shark)
 Glyphis glyphis (J. P. Müller & Henle, 1839) (speartooth shark)
 Glyphis sp. not yet described (Mukah river shark)
 Genus Lamiopsis Gill, 1862
 Lamiopsis temminckii (J. P. Müller & Henle, 1839) (broadfin shark)
 Lamiopsis tephrodes (Fowler, 1905) (Borneo broadfin shark)
 Genus Nasolamia Compagno & Garrick, 1983
 Nasolamia velox (Gilbert, 1898) (whitenose shark)
 Genus Negaprion Whitley, 1940
 Negaprion acutidens (Rüppell, 1837) (sicklefin lemon shark)
 Negaprion brevirostris (Poey, 1868) (lemon shark)
 †Negaprion eurybathrodon (Blake, 1862)
 Genus Prionace Cantor, 1849
 Prionace glauca (Linnaeus, 1758) (blue shark)
 Genus Rhizoprionodon Whitley, 1929
 Rhizoprionodon acutus (Rüppell, 1837) (milk shark)
 Rhizoprionodon lalandii (J. P. Müller & Henle, 1839) (Brazilian sharpnose shark)
 Rhizoprionodon longurio (D. S. Jordan & Gilbert, 1882) (Pacific sharpnose shark)
 Rhizoprionodon oligolinx V. G. Springer, 1964 (grey sharpnose shark)
 Rhizoprionodon porosus (Poey, 1861) (Caribbean sharpnose shark)
 Rhizoprionodon taylori (Ogilby, 1915) (Australian sharpnose shark)
 Rhizoprionodon terraenovae (J. Richardson, 1836) (Atlantic sharpnose shark)
 Genus Loxodon J. P. Müller & Henle, 1838
 Loxodon macrorhinus (J. P. Müller & Henle, 1839) (sliteye shark)
 Genus Isogomphodon Gill, 1862
 Isogomphodon oxyrhynchus (J. P. Müller & Henle, 1839) (daggernose shark)
 Genus Triaenodon J. P. Müller & Henle, 1837
 Triaenodon obesus (Rüppell, 1837) (whitetip reef shark)

† = extinct

See also
 Shark meat

References

External links
 Requiem Shark Photo Gallery (Bahamas)
 Elasmo-research
 International Shark Attack File

 
Taxa named by David Starr Jordan
Taxa named by Barton Warren Evermann
Extant Valanginian first appearances